Meresht (also known as Mīresh and Mirish) is a village in Sanjabad-e Shomali Rural District, in the Central District of Kiwi County, Ardabil Province, Iran. At the 2006 census, its population was 444, in 101 families. At the 2011 census, its population was 354, in 86 families.

References 
3. Meresht Website: http://meresht.ir
Tageo

Towns and villages in Kowsar County